Minhang Development Zone is a metro station on Line 5 of the Shanghai Metro. It is the current southern terminus of the line, and is located in the suburban Minhang District. The location is close to the Outer-ringway giving the zone quick access to both airports of the city. The opening of Line 5 has dramatically improved access to the central districts of Shanghai.

Passengers can transfer to the main line at Dongchuan Road. However, since 26 December 2020, this is not the case, as trains have resumed service all the way to Xinzhuang.

The zone contains factories for companies that produce machinery, electronics, pharmaceuticals, beverages and entertainment products.

References

Railway stations in Shanghai
Shanghai Metro stations in Minhang District
Railway stations in China opened in 2003
Line 5, Shanghai Metro